Ohm (symbol Ω) is a unit of electrical resistance named after Georg Ohm.

Ohm or OHM may also refer to:

People
 Georg Ohm (1789–1854), German physicist and namesake of the term ohm
 Germán Ohm (born 1936), Mexican boxer
 Jörg Ohm (born 1944), former East German football player
 Martin Ohm (1792–1872), German mathematician
 Rebecca Ohm, United States Air Force officer and fighter pilot
 Rune Ohm (born 1980), Danish handball player
 Thorsten Ohm, CEO of VDM Publishing
 Pawat Chittsawangdee, Thai actor, nicknamed Ohm
 Thitiwat Ritprasert, Thai actor, nicknamed Ohm

Places

Germany
 Ohm (river), right tributary of the Lahn near Cölbe
 Zwester Ohm, left tributary of the Lahn near Fronhausen

Outer space
 24750 Ohm, an outer main belt asteroid
 Ohm (crater) on the Moon

Science and technology
 Acoustic ohm, a unit of measurement of acoustic impedance
 Ohm's law, law that relates electrical resistance, current, and voltage
 OHM (Observe. Hack. Make.), a 2013 outdoor hacker conference
 OpenHistoricalMap, a collaboratively edited historical atlas of the world

Media and entertainment

Music
 OHM (band), a rock/jazz fusion music group
 OHM: The Early Gurus of Electronic Music, 2000 album
 Ohms (album), a 2020 album by Deftones
 "Ohm", song by indie band Yo La Tengo from the album Fade
 "Ohm", a song by metalcore band Northlane from the album Node

Fictional entities
 Ohm (One Piece), a character in the Japanese manga and anime
 Johnny Ohm, a Marvel Comics supervillain
 Ohm, a character from the Air Gear manga
 Ohm, a race of arthropodean creatures, also "Ohmu", from the film Nausicaä of the Valley of the Wind

Other uses in media
 Organisatie Hindoe Media, a Dutch public broadcaster
 Ohm Krüger, a 1941 German biographical film

Other uses
 Alternative spelling for Om, a sacred sound and symbol of several Indian religions
 Alternative spelling for the Korean name Um

See also
 Ohms (disambiguation)
 Aum (disambiguation)
 Om (disambiguation)
 Omu (disambiguation)